Julie Rice in an entrepreneur, investor and co-founder of SoulCycle, a New York City-based fitness company that offers indoor cycling (also known as "spinning") workout classes.

Personal life 
Rice studied English and theater at Binghamton University. She is married to Spencer Rice. The couple has two daughters.

Career 

Rice worked as a talent manager for exotic dancers in Los Angeles for twenty years. She moved back to New York in 2002. Rice founded SoulCycle in 2006 with Elizabeth Cutler and Ruth Zukerman. SoulCycle's first studio was on the Upper West Side. The three were self-funded with a large amount of the money coming from Cutler's investment in Izze Beverage Company.

Rice sold most of her SoulCycle shares to Equinox Fitness in 2011. She sold the remainder of her shares to Equinox in 2016 for approximately $90 million.  She remains on the board.

Rice was named Chief Brand Officer of WeWork in November 2017. She resigned from WeWork in 2019.

Rice and Cutler co-founded the company Peoplehood in 2019. The company facilitates guided conversations.

References

Living people
Businesspeople from New York City
Talent managers
Businesspeople from Los Angeles
Binghamton University alumni
21st-century American businesspeople
American women business executives
Year of birth missing (living people)
21st-century American businesswomen